Abdou Traoré may refer to the name of three footballers:
Abdou Traoré (footballer, born 1981), Malian footballer
Abdou Traoré (footballer, born 1988), Malian footballer
Abdou Razack Traoré (born 1988), Burkanese-Ivorian footballer who plays for Turkish club Konyaspor